Jonathan Thaxton (born 10 September 1974) is a British former professional boxer who competed from 1992 to 2009. He held the British lightweight title from 2006 and 2007, and the EBU European title from 2008 to 2009.

Professional career
He had his first professional fight in December 1992, beating Scott Smith on points over six rounds in Stoke on Trent. In his early career he fought as a light-welterweight. His first fight for a major title was in September 1996, when he won the WBO Intercontinental Light-Welterweight title, beating Bernard Paul of Mauritius on points. In November 1997, he won the IBF Intercontinental Light-Welterweight title, beating Rimvidas Bilius of Lithuania on points. In September 1998, he lost both titles, when he lost to the American, Emanuel Augustus, being knocked out in the seventh.

In November 1999, he fought Jason Rowland for the British light-welterweight title, losing when the fight was stopped in the fifth. In October 2000, he had another shot at the now vacant British light-welterweight title when he fought Ricky Hatton. Despite Hatton being cut badly in the first round, he went on to defeat Thaxton on points. In February 2002, he fought Eamonn Magee for the Commonwealth light-welterweight title, losing when the fight was stopped in the sixth.

Between 2002 and 2004, Thaxton spent two years out of the ring with a shoulder injury after a road accident.

WBF title
In April 2005, he knocked out Frenchman Christophe De Busillet in the fourth, to take the vacant World Boxing Foundation (WBFo) world lightweight title. In September 2005, he defended the title against Romanian Vasile Dragomir, scoring a knockout in the fourth round.

British title
In December 2006, he fought Lee Meager, the holder of the British lightweight title. Thaxton scored a unanimous points victory to take the title. In March 2007, he defended the British lightweight title against Scott Lawton, winning by a technical knockout in the seventh. In October 2007, he defended the British lightweight title again, this time against Dave Stewart, winning by a technical knockout in the twelfth round.

European title challenge
In April 2008, he challenged Yuri Romanov, of Belarus, for his European lightweight title. The fight was stopped at the start of the sixth when Thaxton's corner refused to let him come out due to bad cuts. This was Thaxton's first defeat after twelve straight wins. On 4 October 2008, Thaxton captured the vacated European lightweight title in the third round of the contest against Spaniard Juan Carlos Melero Diaz.

Titles
IBF Inter-Continental light-welterweight champion
WBO Inter-Continental light welterweight champion
WBF World Lightweight champion
British Lightweight champion
European Lightweight champion

Professional boxing record

See also
List of British lightweight boxing champions

References

External links
 Fight stats
 The Official Website of Jon Thaxton

1974 births
Living people
Sportspeople from Norwich
English male boxers
Lightweight boxers